Lamprocystis fastigata is a species of small air-breathing land snails, terrestrial pulmonate gastropod mollusks in the family Euconulidae, the hive snails. This species is found in Guam and Northern Mariana Islands.

References

Lamprocystis
Taxonomy articles created by Polbot